Argon is a 2017 South Korean television series directed by Lee Yoon-jung, starring Kim Joo-hyuk and Chun Woo-hee as passionate reporters. The series marks Chun Woo-hee's first small screen lead role. It aired on cable channel tvN every Monday and Tuesday at 22:50 (KST) from September 4–26, 2017.

It was one of Kim Joo-hyuk's last projects before his death on October 30, 2017.

Synopsis
The story of truthful reporters who strive to deliver the facts in a world full of fake news.

Cast

Main
 Kim Joo-hyuk as Kim Baek-jin, a perfectionist news anchor, reporter and leader of a news program called Argon.
 Chun Woo-hee as Lee Yeon-hwa, a temporary employee who gets transferred to the Argon team in the last 3 months of her contract and fights to become an official reporter.

Supporting
 Park Won-sang as Shin Chul, the producer of Argon and a veteran reporter.
 Lee Seung-joon as Yoo Myung-ho, the report bureau chief.
 Shin Hyun-bin as Chae Soo-min, a lawyer and long-time friend of Baek-jin.
 Park Hee-von as Yook Hye-ri, a veteran writer.
 Shim Ji-ho as Uhm Min-ho, a smart newspaper reporter from the finance department.
 Park Min-ha as Lee Jin-hee, also known as "the pretty writer" who loves being called that she relies on tricks and charm more than her writing skills to get her through work.
 Ji Il-joo as Park Nam-gyu
 Ji Yoon-ho as Oh Seung-yong
 Kim Joo-hun as Ahn Jae-geun, a whistleblower at Seomyoung Foods.

Original soundtrack 
Argon soundtrack album written by music director Tearliner contains 2 single) album and one album with 10 score pieces from the series. It features vocal performances from Cho Won-sun and Owen.

Singles

Production
The first script reading of the cast was held on July 12, 2017.

Ratings

References

External links
  
 
 
 

TVN (South Korean TV channel) television dramas
2017 South Korean television series debuts
2017 South Korean television series endings
Television series by Studio Dragon
Television series about journalism
Korean-language Netflix exclusive international distribution programming